Koki is a village on the island of Anjouan in the Comoros. According to the 1991 census the village had a population of 3,066. The current calculation for 2012 is 5,866 people

References

Populated places in Anjouan